João Sousa was the defending champion, but to decided compete at the 2013 Guimarães Open instead.

Jesse Huta Galung won the title, defeating Maxime Teixeira in the final, 6–4, 6–3.

Seeds

Draw

Finals

Top half

Bottom half

References
Main Draw
Qualifying Draw

Tampere Open - Singles
2013 Singles